is a former Japanese professional baseball player for the Nippon Professional Baseball Chunichi Dragons, having played his professional career for them since his debut in . He was drafted in the first round in the  NPB Draft.

Tatsunami holds the all-time NPB double record with 487, and is a member of the Meikyukai (Association of Great Players, or Golden Players Club).

After the 2009 season, Tatsunami retired, having seen his skills and playing time diminish for the last few seasons. He retired with a career .285 batting average, 171 home runs, 1,037 RBI, and 2,480 hits.

On 15 January 2019, Tatsunami was inducted into the Japanese Baseball Hall of Fame for his achievements as a player.

On 13 October 2021, it was confirmed that Tatsunami has been approached to become the new manager of the Dragons ahead of the 2022 NPB season.

References

External links
 

1969 births
Living people
People from Settsu, Osaka
Japanese baseball players
Nippon Professional Baseball infielders
Chunichi Dragons players
Chunichi Dragons managers
Nippon Professional Baseball Rookie of the Year Award winners
Japanese baseball coaches
Japanese Baseball Hall of Fame inductees
Managers of baseball teams in Japan